History of Aurangzib is a book in five volumes by Indian historian Jadunath Sarkar about the Mughal ruler Aurangzeb.

The book is considered to be the magnum opus of Jadunath Sarkar and was written between 1912 and 1924. It has been called the most authoritative account of Aurangzeb.

The book had its critics. A.L. Srivastava replied to the criticism that Sarkar's interpretation of the jizya was not fair, arguing that Sarkar had only summed up the agreed judgements of the Muslim jurists. C.C. David wrote that the belief that Sarkar was biased against the Mughal rulers was groundless.

References

Bibliography

External links
 History of Aurangzib on archive.org.

Aurangzeb
History books about India